Sven von Holst (born 30 August 1948) is a retired Swedish freestyle swimmer. He competed in the individual 400 m event at the 1968 Summer Olympics, but failed to reach the final.

References

External links
 

1948 births
Living people
Swedish male freestyle swimmers
Olympic swimmers of Sweden
Swimmers at the 1968 Summer Olympics
Swimmers from Stockholm
Stockholms KK swimmers